The latest Minister of Youth and Sports is Hannah Yeoh from 3 December 2022. The Minister administers the portfolio through the Ministry of Youth and Sports.

List of Ministers of Youth and Sports
The following individuals have been appointed as Minister of Youth and Sports, or any of its precedent titles:

Political Party:

References

Ministry of Youth and Sports (Malaysia)
Lists of government ministers of Malaysia
Sports ministers